The Cathays Cemetery is one of the main cemeteries of Cardiff, Wales. At 110 acres it is the third largest cemetery in the United Kingdom. It is listed on the Cadw/ICOMOS Register of  Parks and Gardens of Special Historic Interest in Wales.

History

The cemetery was opened in 1859 and originally had two chapels: one Anglican and the other non-conformist, and each including its own porte-cochère. The cemetery has a Roman Catholic section, where a Roman Catholic chapel was built later.

In the Second World War, air raids damaged Cathays Cemetery with a number of bombs and an aerial mine. During the early/mid 1970s the cemetery was split into two sections to allow the building of the A48 Eastern Avenue which was a continuation of the A48(M). In the 20th century all three chapels were neglected and in the 1980s the Roman Catholic one was demolished. Since 2008 the Anglican and non-conformist chapels have been undergoing restoration. One of the most imposing memorials is that of Frank Baselow, thought to be a result of Baselow's European heritage (his actual name was Franz) and the taste on the Continent for grand memorials.

The two chapels, the cemetery house, and the gateway and forecourt walls, are Grade II listed buildings. The cemetery itself is listed at Grade II on the Cadw/ICOMOS Register of  Parks and Gardens of Special Historic Interest in Wales.

War graves

The cemetery has a Commonwealth War Graves (CWGC) section, marked by a Cross of Sacrifice made to the standard design devised by Reginald Blomfield. The section was established in the First World War, when Cardiff's nearby main hospitals treated numerous servicemen who had been wounded in action, or who contracted influenza in the 1918–19 influenza pandemic.

The war graves section includes a number of graves of Australian and Canadian servicemen, one New Zealander who died while serving in the Royal Defence Corps, and one soldier of the Prince of Wales's Leinster Regiment. Also present is the grave of Jacques Vaillant de Guélis, a Special Operations Executive agent. The cemetery includes the graves of 21 French Navy sailors from the First World War, mostly in the Roman Catholic section, and a similar number of Norwegian sailors from the Second. Elsewhere in the cemetery are numerous Commonwealth War Graves from both the First and Second World Wars.  The cemetery contains the graves of 685 service personnel which are registered and maintained by the CWGC. Victims of the Cardiff Blitz who are buried in the cemetery are commemorated by a memorial erected in 1993.

Notable interments
Robert Bird, Liberal Party politician
Sir James Cory, 1st Baronet, shipowner and Conservative Party politician
Jim Driscoll, boxer
John Emlyn-Jones, shipowner and Liberal politician
John Humphrey England, founder of Edward England Potatoes.
Louisa Maud Evans, a young girl who died in a ballooning accident in 1896.
John Cuthbert Hedley, Roman Catholic bishop
Archibald Hood, colliery owner
Thomas Rowland Hughes, writer
David (Dai) Lewis, professional boxer murdered by Driscoll and Rowlands in 1927 (contested)
Hilary Marquand, Labour Party politician
Sir William Henry Seager, shipowner and Liberal politician
Frances Batty Shand, founder of Cardiff Institute for the Blind
Sir William Reardon Smith, 1st Baronet, shipowner
William Tatem, 1st Baron Glanely, shipowner
Sir Tudor Thomas, ophthalmic surgeon
Alfred Thomas, 1st Baron Pontypridd, Liberal politician
Maurice Turnbull, Glamorgan and England cricketer
Ernest Willows, aviation pioneer and airship builder
Several Senghenydd Colliery Disaster victims

Notes

Sources and further reading

External links

The Friends of Cathays Cemetery

 – photographs
 – photographs

1859 establishments in Wales
Cathays
Cemeteries in Cardiff
Commonwealth War Graves Commission cemeteries in Wales
Registered historic parks and gardens in Cardiff
Grade II listed buildings in Cardiff